John Gellibrand Hubbard, 1st Baron Addington PC (21 March 1805 – 28 August 1889), was a City of London financier and a Conservative Party politician.

Hubbard was born at Stratford Grove, Essex, the son of John Hubbard and his wife Marianne Morgan. He was a merchant in the City of London being head of the firm 'J. Hubbard & Co.', Russian Merchants.

He was by profession a banker, his family had a business in St Petersburg, which was not strictly commercial, but had an operation in London. It was enough for him to become a director of Guardian Fire and Life Assurance Co. In 1838 he joined the elite as a director of the Bank of England, later rising to become successively Deputy Governor and then Governor.

Convinced capital and income should be treated differently he lobbied parliament to recognise the legal treatment of income tax on earned income only, which was eventually achieved in 1907. He was of Chairman of the Public Works and Exchequer Loan Committee between 1853 and 1875.

Hubbard was deeply interested in religion and the High Church in the Puseyite tradition, yet he rejected ritualism. In 1863 he built and endowed St Alban's Church, Holborn, where he was also churchwarden. Father Mackonochie, an Irish priest, used a Catholic ritual not to his liking, which prompted a stiff letter to the Bishop of London in 1868.

Hubbard was a JP and Deputy Lieutenant for Buckinghamshire and the City of London. In his lifetime Hubbard was active in funding Canon Nathaniel Woodard's national network of Woodard Schools.

Hubbard was elected as a Member of Parliament (MP) for Buckingham at the 1859 general election. He was re-elected in 1865 but when Buckingham's representation was reduced to one MP at the 1868 general election he was defeated. He returned to the House of Commons at the 1874 general election when he was elected as one of the four MPs for the City of London, and held the seat until he was created 1st Baron Addington, of Addington, Buckinghamshire, on 22 July 1887. He was invested as a Privy Counsellor in 1874.

Hubbard died at Addington Manor, Buckinghamshire, at the age of 84.

Hubbard married Maria Margaret Napier, daughter of Captain William John Napier, 9th Lord Napier of Merchistoun, and Eliza Cochrane-Johnstone, on 19 May 1837, and they had the following children:
Alice Eliza Hubbard (1841–1931)
Egerton Hubbard, 2nd Baron Addington (1842–1915)
Lucy Marian Hubbard (1845–1893)
Cecil John Hubbard (1846–1926)
Arthur Gellibrand Hubbard (1848–1896)
Rose Ellen Hubbard (1851–1933)
Evelyn Hubbard (1852–1934)
Clemency Hubbard (1856–1940)

His three sons, Egerton, Cecil John, and Evelyn were educated at Radley College. Hubbard played a decisive role in rescuing the school's finances when they collapsed in 1860. He effectively refounded the school using his acumen to raise the fees, boost numbers, and fund the debts. In the same year that he was elevated to the peerage, the school paid the last installment. Baron Addington was a friend of Montagu Norman, a Governor of the Bank of England, who also had a strong connection to the school.

Works
 with Trevor, George, The Conscience Clause in 1866 (1866)

Arms

References

External links 

 
 

1805 births
1889 deaths
Hubbard, John
Hubbard, John
Hubbard, John
Hubbard, John
Hubbard, John
Hubbard, John
Hubbard, John
UK MPs who were granted peerages
Governors of the Bank of England
Deputy Lieutenants of Buckinghamshire
Conservative Party (UK) hereditary peers
Members of Parliament of the United Kingdom for the City of London
Deputy Governors of the Bank of England
Members of the Privy Council of the United Kingdom
John 1
Peers of the United Kingdom created by Queen Victoria
19th-century English businesspeople